The 2017 Tarleton State Texans football team represented Tarleton State University in the 2017 NCAA Division II football season. They were led by head coach Todd Whitten, who was in his consecutive second season at Tarleton State and eighth overall as head coach of the Texans. The Texans played their home games at Memorial Stadium and were members of the Lone Star Conference. The Texans finished the regular season with a 6–5 record, 4–4 in the LSC, and tie for fourth place in the Lone Star Conference.

Schedule

Tarleton State announced its 2017 football schedule on April 25, 2017. The schedule consisted of five home and six away games in the regular season. The Texans hosted LSC foes Eastern New Mexico, Texas A&M-Commerce, and West Texas A&M and traveled to Angelo State, Midwestern State, Texas-Permian Basin, Texas A&M-Kingsville, and Western New Mexico.

The Texans hosted two of the three non-conference games against Oklahoma Panhandle State from the Central States Football League and  Western Oregon from the Great Northwest Athletic Conference and  visited Delta State from the Gulf South Conference.

References

Tarleton State
Tarleton State Texans football seasons
Tarleton State Texans football